In a Gospel Way is an album by American country music artist George Jones, released in 1974 on the Epic Records label.

Background
Jones affinity for gospel music dated back to his childhood when he learned to play the guitar at the church where his mother Clara played piano.  This was Jones fifth collection of spiritual music; he had recorded three on his own (the first dating back to 1959) and one with his wife Tammy Wynette titled We Love To Sing About Jesus in 1972.  AllMusic states that "Although producer Billy Sherrill's use of billowy string arrangements, crying steel guitar and the Jordanaires and Nashville Edition as background vocalists makes Gospel Way a neat, countrypolitan package, Possum's pain radiates clearly in songs such as 'Mama's Hands' and 'Release Me (From My Sin).'

Track listing
"In a Gospel Way" (Earl Montgomery, George Jones)
"Why Me, Lord?" (Kris Kristofferson)
"A Man I Always Wanted to Meet" (Bobby Braddock, Curly Putman)
"The Baptism of Jesse Taylor" (Dallas Frazier, Sanger D. Shafer)
"Release Me (From My Sin)" (Eddie Miller, William McCall)
"Amazing Grace" (John Newton, Bill Walker, William J. Gaither)
"Mama's Hands" (Larry Kingston, Frank Dycus)
"God Keeps the Wild Flowers Blooming" (Bobby Abshire)
"Mama Was a Preacher Man" (Earl Montgomery, George Jones)
"I Wonder How John Felt (When He Baptised Jesus)" (Billy Sherrill, Norro Wilson, Carmol Taylor)
"I Can't Find It Here" (Curly Putman)

External links
George Jones' Official Website
Record Label

1974 albums
George Jones albums
Albums produced by Billy Sherrill
Epic Records albums
Southern gospel albums